Miss trans Star International (formerly Miss trans Star Internacional) is a beauty pageant for transgender women. It was first held in 2010 in Barcelona, in Catalonia, Spain. The winner receives a crown and prize money. The election was organized by Rincon Tranny in 2010 and LadyJulia in 2012. In 2016, the pageant was renamed to Miss Trans Star International.

Titleholders

By number of wins

Runners-up

See also
 Miss International Queen
 Miss Continental
 Miss Tiffany's Universe
 Miss Trans Albania
 Miss Trans Israel
 Miss T World
 The World's Most Beautiful Transsexual Contest

References

External links
   

2010 establishments in Spain
Beauty pageants in Spain
Transgender beauty pageants
Recurring events established in 2010
LGBT beauty pageants